A by-election was held for the New South Wales Legislative Assembly electorate of Burwood on 2 June 1951 because of the death of Gordon Jackett.

Dates

Result

Gordon Jackett died.

See also
Electoral results for the district of Burwood (New South Wales)
List of New South Wales state by-elections

References

1951 elections in Australia
New South Wales state by-elections
1950s in New South Wales